Three athletes represented India at the 2010 Winter Olympics in Vancouver, British Columbia, Canada.  They did not win any medals. Typically for the Summer Olympics, Indian Olympic athletes are supported indirectly (through jobs for athletes at the Ministry of Railways), augmented by private support from various sources, including (this year) support and uniforms provided by Indo-Canadians.  At the 2010 Winter Olympics, two skiers, both Ladakh Scouts and graduates of the High Altitude Warfare School, are supported indirectly by the Indian Army, while the third athlete has cobbled together late-arriving Ministry of Sports support, augmented by contributions from two corporations, Swissair and Limca.

Alpine skiing

Cross-country skiing

Luge

Shiva Keshavan received 450,000 rupees from five Indian lawyers to purchase a new luge for competition after his previous luge - held together by duct tape and screws - broke during training in November.  This was in addition to the funding equivalent to $US20,000 he received from the Ministry of Sports in 2009, money he got after being awarded a bronze medal at the Asian Championships. Although Keshavan had represented his country thrice before, in the 1998 Winter Olympics in Nagano, Salt Lake City in 2002 and again in Torino in 2006, 2009 was the first time he received any government support.

References

Nations at the 2010 Winter Olympics
2010
2010 in Indian sport